Varsha Eknath Gaikwad is an Indian politician from the Indian National Congress party, who was the Cabinet Minister of Maharashtra from 30 December 2019 to 29 June 2022. 
She is a four term Member of the Maharashtra Legislative Assembly (MLA) representing the Dharavi Assembly Constituency in Mumbai, Maharashtra.

Positions held 
 2004 – 2009: Member of Maharashtra Legislative Assembly (1st term)
 2009 – 2014: Member of Maharashtra Legislative Assembly (2nd term)
2009-2010: State Minister for Medical Education, Higher and Technical Education, Tourism, Special Assistance
 2010 – 2014: Cabinet Minister for Women and Child Development, Government of Maharashtra
 2014 – 2019: Member of Maharashtra Legislative Assembly (3rd term)
 2019 – current: Member of Maharashtra Legislative Assembly (4th term)

Personal life
Varsha Gaikwad's father is Eknath Gaikwad, who was a three term Member of parliament. She belongs to an Ambedkarite Buddhist family. She was lecturer in Siddharth College of Arts, Science and Commerce, Mumbai.

References

Living people
Maharashtra MLAs 2004–2009
Maharashtra MLAs 2009–2014
Maharashtra MLAs 2014–2019
Maharashtra MLAs 2019–2024
Indian Buddhists
20th-century Buddhists
21st-century Buddhists
Indian National Congress politicians
Marathi politicians
Year of birth missing (living people)